Pupilla triplicata is a species of minute air-breathing land snail, a terrestrial pulmonate gastropod mollusk or micromollusk in the family Pupillidae.

Distribution 
The distribution of this species is central-European and southern-European and includes southern Europe from the Pyrenees to the Alps, the Carpathians, Crimea, northern Turkey, Transcaucasia and central Asia to Lake Baikal.

The species occurs in a number of countries including:
 Lower concern in  Switzerland
 Endangered in Germany, extinct in Rheinland-Pfalz
 Vulnerable in Austria
 Czech Republic
 Slovakia
 Poland
 Ukraine

Pupilla triplicata has a scattered distribution, and populations in lower altitudes are threatened by habitat destruction.

Description 
The shell of Pupilla triplicata is much smaller than Pupilla sterrii and the other Pupilla species. The structure of the surface is finer. Whorls are convex. The cervical callus is present but not extremely strong. There are usually 3 teeth in the aperture.

The height of the shell is 2.2-2.8 (up to 4) mm. The width of the shell is 1.4 mm (shell diameter should not exceed much 1.4 mm).

Ecology 
Pupilla triplicata lives in grass near limestone rocks, in dry and sunny habitats, often in limestone rock rubble with xerophilous vegetation. It lives mainly between 300 and 1000 m, and in Switzerland up to 2600 m in altitude.

References
This article incorporates public domain text from the reference.

External links 

Pupillidae
Gastropods described in 1820